The Sefer Chafetz Chaim (or Chofetz Chaim or Hafetz Hayim) (trans. "Desirer of Life") is a book by Rabbi Yisrael Meir Kagan, who is also called "the Chofetz Chaim" after it. The book deals with the Jewish ethics and laws of speech.

The Sefer
The title of the Chafetz Chaim is taken from Psalms:

The subject of the book is hilchos shmiras halashon (laws of clean speech). Kagan provides copious sources from the Torah, Talmud and Rishonim about the severity of Jewish law on tale-mongering and gossip. Lashon hara, meaning "'evil speech" (or loosely gossip and slander and prohibitions of defamation), is sometimes translated as "prohibitions of slander", but in essence is concerning the prohibitions of saying evil/bad/unpleasant things about a person, whether or not they are true.

The book is divided into three parts:
 Mekor Chayim ("Source of Life"), the legal text.
 Be'er mayim chayim ("Well of living water"), the footnotes and legal argument.
 It is commonly printed together with the text Shemirath ha-Lashon ("Guarding of the tongue"), an ethical treatise on the proper use of the faculty of speech.

The author

Rabbi Yisrael Meir Kagan is commonly known as the Chafetz Chaim, the name of his famous work on guarding one's tongue. He was born in Dzyatlava, Grodno Governorate, Russian Empire (today Belarus), on January 26, 1838. As his reputation grew, students from all over Europe flocked to him and by 1869 his house became known as the Radin Yeshiva. Kagan published twenty one books. His first work, Chafetz Chaim (1873), is the first attempt to organize and clarify the laws regarding Lashon Hara. Other notable works include the Sefer Shmirat HaLashon, an ethical work on the importance of guarding one's tongue and the Mishnah Berurah (printed between 1894 and 1907) which is a commentary on the "Orach Chayim", the first section of the Shulchan Aruch, and has been accepted universally among many Ashkenazi Jews as an authoritative source of Halacha.

References

External links
 Chofetz Chaim Heritage Foundation
 Online edition in Hebrew
 A Lesson A Day: A Daily Learning Program
 Chofetz Chaim Daily Calendar
 Devekut.com has a link ("Chofetz Chaim") with an abstract of a book by Rabbis Shimon Finkelman and Yitzhak Berkowitz about Chofetz Chaim's ideas.

1873 books
Hebrew-language religious books
Rabbinic legal texts and responsa